Fabula may refer to:

Fabula, Latin word for a fable
Fabula, Latin word for a play (see Theatre of ancient Rome)
 Fabula atellana, Attelan farce
 Fabula palliata, Roman comedy in a Greek setting
 Fabula togata, Roman comedy in a Roman setting
 Fabula crepidata, Roman tragedy in a Greek setting
 Fabula praetexta, Roman tragedy in a Roman setting
 Fabula saltata, Roman pantomime (dancer accompanied by song)
Fabula, Law Latin for a contract or covenant
Fabula and syuzhet, terms in Russian formalism
Fabula (moth), genus of moths
Fabula Award, Slovenian literary award
Fabula (journal), a multilingual journal in folkloristics